Øst-Finnmark was a Norwegian newspaper, published in Kirkenes in Finnmark county.

Øst-Finnmark was started as a weekly newspaper in 1947 as the Communist Party of Norway organ in the region. A second Communist newspaper in the region was Vardø Framtid. Both these newspapers went defunct in 1951.

References

1947 establishments in Norway
1951 disestablishments in Norway
Communist Party of Norway newspapers
Defunct newspapers published in Norway
Mass media in Finnmark
Norwegian-language newspapers
Publications established in 1947
Publications disestablished in 1951
Sør-Varanger